Angelus is a historic house located at 1114 North Cutting Avenue in Jennings, Louisiana.

Built by the Jaenke family in 1907, the two-story frame house is Colonial Revival in style.  Its entrance portico includes two sets of paired Ionic columns.

A second one and a half story contributing building is present in the area, as well as a non-contributing modern carport/storage building.

The house was listed on the National Register of Historic Places on April 16, 1993.

See also
 National Register of Historic Places listings in Jefferson Davis Parish, Louisiana

References

Houses on the National Register of Historic Places in Louisiana
Colonial Revival architecture in Louisiana
Houses completed in 1907
Jefferson Davis Parish, Louisiana